Zygmunt Garłowski (5 October 1949 – 7 February 2008) was a Polish footballer. He played in three matches for the Poland national football team from 1974 to 1976.

References

External links
 

1949 births
2008 deaths
Polish footballers
Poland international footballers
Place of birth missing
Association football midfielders